Shiloh is an unincorporated community in unincorporated northeast Waller County, Texas, United States, about  north of Prairie View along Farm to Market Road 1098. The community grew up around the Shiloh Baptist Church which was established in 1871.

Education
The settlement is within Waller Independent School District.

External links

Unincorporated communities in Waller County, Texas
Unincorporated communities in Texas